Dadashov, Dadasov or Dadashev (Azerbaijani: Dadaşov, Russian: Дадашев) is an Azerbaijani masculine surname, its feminine counterpart is Dadashova, Dadasova or Dadasheva. People with this surname include:

Brilliant Dadashova (born 1959 or 1965), Azerbaijani pop singer
Ibrahim Dadashov (1926–1990), Azerbaijani wrestler
Maharram Dadashev (1912–1944), Azerbaijani soldier
Maxim Dadashev (1990–2019), Russian boxer 
Milana Dadasheva (born 1995), Russian freestyle wrestler
Murad Dadashov (born 1978), Azerbaijani TV host, producer and actor
Rufat Dadashov (born 1991), Azerbaijani football striker
Sadig Dadashov (1905–1946), Azerbaijani architect and architecture historian 

Azerbaijani-language surnames